was a member of the Japanese doomsday-cult group Aum Shinrikyo who was convicted and executed for murder during the Tokyo subway sarin attack.

Early life
Born in 1964, Hirose was an outstanding student in his early years. In 1983, Hirose was admitted by Waseda University and chose applied physics as his major. In 1987, Hirose graduated from Waseda University as the best student in his grade and entered the Graduate School of Waseda University with a research topic on high-temperature superconductivity. Working with his supervisor, he published a paper in July 1987. His supervisor said Hirose was a gifted scientist. At the same time, Hirose began to wonder if the knowledge he learned in the university could help the society.

Joining Aum Shinrikyo and leading secret assault rifle production
In 1988, Hirose read books written by Shoko Asahara by accident. He was attracted by Asahara and began to correspond with Asahara. Per Asahara's request, in 1989, after graduating from graduate school and getting his master's degree, Hirose declined a job offered by NEC and joined Aum Shinrikyo, becoming an important person in this group. In the early 1990s, he produced around 1,000 assault rifles based on the AK-74. It's reported that Hirose once went to Russia to test assault rifles produced by him.

Tokyo subway gas attack, arrest, trial and execution
In 1995, Hirose took part in the Tokyo subway sarin attack. He was assigned to release the sarin in the train A777 on Marunouchi Line. Hirose was arrested in the same year. In 2000, he was sentenced to death. In 2006, his appeal was dismissed. On July 26, 2018, Hirose was executed by hanging in the Tokyo Detention House.

See also
 Capital punishment in Japan
 List of executions in Japan

References

1964 births
2018 deaths
Aum Shinrikyo
20th-century Japanese criminals
People executed by Japan by hanging
People from Tokyo
Waseda University alumni
Japanese people convicted of murder
21st-century executions by Japan
Japanese mass murderers
Executed mass murderers